Travis Moore (born August 5, 1970) is a former professional Canadian football coach who is currently serving as the receivers and pass game coordinator coach for the Ottawa Redblacks of the Canadian Football League (CFL). Moore has also been a coach for the Hamilton Tiger-Cats, BC Lions, Edmonton Eskimos and Saskatchewan Roughriders. As a player, Moore played 10 seasons as a slotback for the Calgary Stampeders and the Saskatchewan Roughriders, winning two Grey Cup championships with the Stampeders in 1998 and 2001. He also played in the one and only XFL season as a wide receiver for the San Francisco Demons team that competed in the league's championship game.

Coaching career 
On November 1, 2022, after a disappointing season, the Riders announced they would not be renewing Moore's contract, along with three other offensive coaches. On December 21, 2022 the Redblacks announced that Moore would rejoin Ottawa for the 2023 season as the team's receivers and pass game coordinator coach. Moore had previously been a member of the Redblacks' coaching staff from 2014-17.

References

External links
Ottawa Redblacks profile

1970 births
Living people
American players of Canadian football
Ball State Cardinals football players
Calgary Stampeders players
Canadian football slotbacks
Edmonton Elks coaches
Saskatchewan Roughriders players
Players of American football from Santa Monica, California
San Francisco Demons players
Ottawa Redblacks coaches
BC Lions coaches
Hamilton Tiger-Cats coaches
Saskatchewan Roughriders coaches